Marktoberdorf is the capital of the Bavarian district of Ostallgäu in the Regierungsbezirk of Swabia.

Marktoberdorf is near Kempten, Füssen, known for the castle Neuschwanstein, Bad Wörishofen, and Schongau. The nearest larger city is Kaufbeuren, eleven kilometers away.

Marktoberdorf plays host to the International Chamber Choir Competition Marktoberdorf every two years. In computer science, it is known for its hosting of the annual International Summer School Marktoberdorf every year since 1970. This Advanced Study Institute of the NATO Security Through Science Committee (now NATO Science for Peace) and the computer science department of the Technische Universität München is a two-week course for young computer scientists and mathematicians working in the field of formal systems development. Students are accommodated in the boarding house of the local high school, Gymnasium Marktoberdorf.

Marktoberdorf is home to the tractor manufacturer Fendt, where its founder Xaver Fendt was born.

Notable residents
Franz Hössler (1906–1945), SS officer at several Nazi concentration camps executed for war crimes
Kevin Volland (born 1992), association football player

Gallery

See also
 Summer School Marktoberdorf, annual computer science summer school

External links

References

Ostallgäu